The DC Universe (DCU) is the fictional shared universe where most stories in American comic book titles published by DC Comics take place. Superheroes such as Superman, Batman, Wonder Woman, Robin, Martian Manhunter, The Flash, Green Lantern, Aquaman, Green Arrow, and Captain Marvel are from this universe, as well as teams such as the Justice League, Teen Titans and the Suicide Squad. It also contains well-known supervillains such as the Joker, Lex Luthor, the Cheetah, Catwoman, Harley Quinn, Poison Ivy, Deathstroke, Deadshot, Black Adam, Professor Zoom, Black Manta, the Penguin, the Riddler, the Scarecrow, Two-Face, Ra’s al Ghul, Sinestro, Atrocitus, Brainiac, and Darkseid. In context, the term "DC Universe" usually refers to the main DC continuity.

The term "DC Multiverse" refers to the collection of all continuities within DC Comics publications. Within the Multiverse, the main DC Universe has gone by many names, but in recent years has been referred to by "Prime Earth" (not to be confused with "Earth Prime") or "Earth 0".

The main DC Universe, as well as the alternate realities related to it, were quickly adapted to other media such as film serials or radio dramas. In subsequent decades, the continuity between all of these media became increasingly complex with certain storylines and events designed to simplify or streamline the more confusing aspects of characters' histories.

History

Golden Age

The fact that DC Comics characters coexisted in the same world was first established in All Star Comics #3 (1940) where several superheroes (who starred in separate stories in the series up to that point) met each other in a group dubbed the Justice Society of America. Earth-Two was the primary world of this publication era, as established in "Flash of Two Worlds" and "Crisis on Earth-Two!".

In the Silver Age, the Justice Society was reimagined as the Justice League of America, which was founded with Major League Baseball's National League and American League as inspiration for the name. The comic book that introduced the Justice League was titled The Brave and the Bold. However, the majority of National/DC's publications continued to be written with little regard of maintaining continuity with each other for the first few decades.

Silver Age

In the 1950s and 1960s, DC has introduced different versions of its characters, sometimes presenting them as if the earlier version had never existed, including: Flash (Barry Allen), Green Lantern (Hal Jordan), and Hawkman (Katar Hol).. These new versions of the characters had similar powers but different names and personal histories. Similarly, they had characters such as Batman whose early adventures set in the 1940s could not easily be reconciled with stories featuring a still-youthful man in the 1960s. To explain this, they introduced the idea of the Multiverse in Flash #123 (1961) where the Silver Age Flash met his Golden Age counterpart. In addition to allowing the conflicting stories to "co-exist", it allowed the differing versions of characters to meet, and even team up to combat cross-universe threats. The writers gave designations such as "Earth-One", "Earth-Two", and so forth, to certain universes, designations which at times were also used by the characters themselves. Earth-One was the primary world of this publication era, as established in "Flash of Two Worlds" and "Crisis on Earth-One!".

Crisis on Infinite Earths

Over the years, as the number of titles published increased and the volume of past stories accumulated, it became increasingly difficult to maintain internal consistency. In the face of diminishing sales, maintaining the status quo of their most popular characters became attractive. Although retcons were used as a way to explain apparent inconsistencies in stories written, editors at DC came to consider the varied continuity of multiple Earths too difficult to keep track of, and feared that it was an obstacle to accessibility for new readers. To address this, they published the cross-universe miniseries Crisis on Infinite Earths in 1985, which merged universes and characters, reducing the Multiverse to a single unnamed universe with a single history.

However, not all the books rebooted post-Crisis.  For example, the Legion of Superheroes book acted as if the Pre-Crisis Earth-1 history was still their past, a point driven home in the Cosmic Boy miniseries. It also removed the mechanism DC had been using to deal with continuity glitches or storylines that a later writer wanted to ignore (which is how Earths B and E came into existence) resulting in a convoluted explanation for characters like Hawkman.

The Zero Hour limited series (1994) gave them an opportunity to revise timelines and rewrite the DC Universe history.  However this failed right out of the gate as the writers had Waverider state all alternate histories had been wiped and yet have the Armageddon 2001 saga in the timeline which required multiple timelines to work.

As a result, almost once per decade since the 1980s, the DC Universe experiences a major crisis that allows any number of changes from new versions of characters to appear as a whole reboot of the universe, restarting nominally all the characters into a new and modernized version of their lives.

Meanwhile, DC has published occasional stories called Elseworlds, which often presented alternate versions of its characters. One told the story of Bruce Wayne as a Green Lantern. In another tale, Superman: Speeding Bullets, the rocket ship that brought the infant Superman to Earth was discovered by the Wayne family of Gotham City rather than the Kents.

In 1999, The Kingdom reintroduced a variant of the old Multiverse concept called Hypertime which essentially allows for alternate versions of characters and worlds again. The entire process was possibly inspired by Alan Moore's meta-comic, Supreme: Story of the Year (1997).

The Convergence (2015) crossover officially retconned the events of Crisis after heroes in that series went back in time to prevent the collapse of the Multiverse.  However, Brainiac states "Each world has evolved but they all still exist".  It has been confirmed that all previous worlds and timelines now exist, and that there are even multiple Multiverses now in existence, such as the Pre-Crisis infinite Multiverse, the collapsed Earth, and the Pre-New 52 52 worlds Multiverse.

Infinite Crisis

The Infinite Crisis event (2005–2006) remade the DC Universe yet again, with new changes. The limited series 52 (2006–2007) established that a new multiverse now existed, with Earth-0 as the primary Earth.

The New 52

The 2011 reboot of the DC Universe coincided with DC's publishing event The New 52, during which the publisher cancelled its ongoing titles and relaunched 52 new books, including a number of new books, set within a revised continuity. This follows the conclusion of the Flashpoint crossover storyline, which provided a jumping-off point for the existing continuity. A number of in-universe changes are intended to make characters more modern and accessible, though the scope of the changes varies from character to character. Some like Batman have their histories left largely intact, though compressed, while others were given wildly different histories and looks. DC stopped putting 'The New 52' logo on its publications in the summer of 2015, coinciding with the Convergence anniversary crossover event which celebrated the history of the DC Multiverse and its various incarnations.

DC Rebirth

In February 2016, DC announced its DC Rebirth initiative, a line-wide relaunch of its titles, to begin in June 2016. DC has used the Green Lantern: Rebirth and The Flash: Rebirth miniseries as examples of the basis for the initiative, which has been described as a rebirth of the DC Universe. The DC Rebirth initiative will reintroduce concepts from pre-Flashpoint continuity, such as legacy, that have been lost with The New 52 and build "on everything that's been published since Action Comics #1 up thru The New 52."

DC Universe
In October 2017, DC revealed that they would be discontinuing the Rebirth branding and logo from their titles in December 2017, releasing everything under a single umbrella title as the DC Universe. Coincided with the release of the New Age of Heroes imprint, DiDio explained, "We want to make it clear that this is all the DC Universe... Rebirth pretty much  the DCU now; while we're taking Rebirth off the books, we'll be following the direction that Rebirth established." Titles also received new trade dress, with those "that tie in clearly to our larger DC Universe" having a "DCU logo on them" in addition to corner boxes with icons of the characters to help identify the family of titles; titles outside the DCU, such as Injustice: Gods Among Us and DC Bombshells would simply have the DC logo on them. DiDio also added that the Young Animal imprint would continue as a separate line of titles.

Infinite Frontier

In 2021, DC announced a line-wide relaunch of ongoing monthly superhero comic book titles. A number of miniseries and one-shots were also announced. It is the follow-up to the DC Rebirth relaunch.

Description

The basic concept of the DC Universe is that it is just like the real world, but with superheroes and supervillains existing in it. However, there are other corollary differences resulting from the justifications implied by that main concept. Many fictional countries, such as Qurac, Vlatava, and Zandia, exist in it. Though stories are often set in the United States of America, they are as often as not set in fictional cities, such as Gotham City or Metropolis. These cities are effectively archetypes of cities, with Gotham City embodying more of the negative aspects of life in a large city, and Metropolis reflecting more of the positive aspects. Sentient alien species (such as Kryptonians and Thanagarians) and even functioning interstellar societies are generally known to exist, and the arrival of alien spacecraft is not uncommon. Technologies which are only theoretical in the real world, such as artificial intelligence or are outright impossible according to modern science, such as faster-than-light travel, are functional and reproducible, though they are often portrayed as highly experimental and difficult to achieve. Demonstrable magic exists and can be learned. The general history of the fictional world is similar to the real one (for instance, there was a Roman Empire, and World War II and 9/11 both occurred), but many fantastic additions exist, such as the known existence of Atlantis. In recent years, stories have increasingly described events which bring the DC Universe farther away from reality, such as World War III occurring, Lex Luthor being elected as President of the United States in 2000, and entire cities and countries being destroyed. There are other minor variations, such as the Earth being slightly larger than ours (to accommodate the extra countries), and the planet Saturn having 18 moons rather than 19 because Superman destroyed one.

New Earth
"New Earth" is the Earth-like home planet to the main storybook characters of the DC Universe - the one with Smallville where Superman grows up, and Gotham City where Bruce Wayne avenges his parents by becoming Batman. This New Earth is part of a larger DC Universe and DC Multiverse.

Originally created from the First Crisis, it was allegedly erased from existence because of the Flashpoint–Convergence effect, being replaced by "Prime Earth". By the end of the storyline Superman Reborn, the timelines of New Earth and Prime Earth have realigned into one single reality.

Superheroes

Many of the superhumans on Earth owe their powers to the "metagene", a genetic feature of unknown origin, which causes some people to develop superpowers when exposed to dangerous substances and forces. Others owe their powers to magic, genetic manipulation (or mutation) or bionics (see below). A large power gap resides between most superheroes and civilians. Still others owe their powers to not being human at all (see races, below). There are also superheroes and supervillains who possess no superhuman powers at all (for example Batman, Robin, Green Arrow or Speedy), but rival their effectiveness with specialized equipment or "to the absolute limit of human potential" training in special skills, such as martial arts.

The humans first began using costumed identities to fight or commit crime during the 1930s. The first superheroes included characters like the Crimson Avenger and The Sandman. In November 1940, the first superhero team, the Justice Society of America, was formed. During World War II, all of America's heroes were banded together as the All-Star Squadron to protect the United States from the Axis powers. However, due to a magical spell cast by Adolf Hitler (using the Spear of Destiny and the Holy Grail) the most powerful heroes were unable to enter Axis-held territories, leaving the offensive portion of the war to be fought mainly by normal humans such as Sgt. Rock while the superheroes participated in defensive activities in Allied territories. After the war, under pressure from the paranoid Committee on Un-American Activities, the JSA disbanded. While many types of heroes were active afterwards (mainly non-costumed, such as the Challengers of the Unknown or Detective Chimp), it was not until Superman's public debut that a new generation of costumed heroes became active. Soon after, the Justice League of America was formed, and they have remained Earth's preeminent superhero team; most DC heroes (such as the Teen Titans) have either belonged to the League at some point, or have connections to it.

As a general rule, being a superhero does not require powers anywhere near omnipotence. Furthermore, even major heroes and cosmic entities have distinct vulnerabilities, such as: Superman's weaknesses to magic, kryptonite, and red sunlight; Green Lantern's initial problems with wood or the color yellow (which have since been largely overcome); or Batman's lack of superhuman powers, which he supplements with keen intellect, constant training, and specialized technology.

Superheroes are generally accepted or even praised—Superman and the Flash actually having museums dedicated to them—by the general public, though some individuals have decided that "the metahumans" must be dealt with less passively. Thus, an organization called "the Dome" was formed to help superheroes who needed to fight crime across international borders; the superhero group called the Global Guardians were their main agents. However the Dome eventually lost out, as its United Nations backing went to the more famous Justice League.  In general, DC Comics has led a parody of its own teams and organizations after the Watchmen storyline and the Batman run from a dark humor style which began during the 1980s and ended in the early 90s.  Superhero teams such as the Doom Patrol and Justice League International led the writers to have a more subtle approach of semiotic dark humor with its own version of over-powered egos dominating personalities.

The American government has had a more wary approach, however. Back during World War II they started "Project M" to create experimental soldiers to fight in the war, such as the Creature Commandos. Most of these experiments remain a secret to the public. Currently, the government deals with metahumans and similar beings through its Department of Extranormal Operations (DEO), and more recently A.R.G.U.S. Covertly, they use an organization of costumed (but non-superhuman) agents known as "Checkmate". The government also formed Task Force X (known as the "Suicide Squad") for "black ops". Most members have been captured supervillains (and thus expendable), and were strongly "encouraged" to join (often with offerings of clemency if they survived their extremely dangerous missions).

Outcast personalities are often relegated to the world of DCU supervillainry. They are then usually well versed in heists, kidnappings and robberies.  Villains with meek powers contrive schemes of extraordinary complexity, yet—because of their simple talents—they only call the attention of powerless superheroes like Batman, or lesser superheroes like Booster Gold. When caught, any prison sufficient to contain these villains is suitable. More powerful villains strive to contest for greater goals like world domination and/or universal acclaim (from the public and their villainous peers).  Usually more powerful enemies are imprisoned in maximum-level facilities—such as Belle Reve Penitentiary (which also was secretly Task Force X's headquarters) and even alternate dimensions or outer space—because they cannot simply be killed by a bullet, electricity, or poison.

Supervillains sometimes also form their own groups, but these tend to be short-lived because most villains simply do not trust each other. Most such teams are formed by a charismatic and/or fearsome criminal mastermind for specific purposes; an example is the Secret Society of Super Villains of which there have been several versions. Most villain teams are usually small, having been formed of individuals who know each other personally, such as the Central City Rogues, or have some other reason to work together (mercenary groups like the H.I.V.E., fanatical cults such as Kobra, etc.).

Advanced technology
Technology more advanced than that which currently exists in real life is available - but it is usually very expensive, and usually only rich or powerful individuals and organizations (or the scientific geniuses who create them) have access to them. S.T.A.R. Labs is an independent research outfit that often develops these devices, while Lexcorp is the main company selling them. The government also runs the secret Project Cadmus (located in the mountains near Metropolis) to develop clones and genetic manipulation without the public's knowledge. Technology can also come from outer space or different timelines. Apokolips weaponry is often sold in Metropolis to the criminal organization known as Intergang.

Robots and similar creations, including cyborgs, can have superior intelligence when they are created as sentient beings.  The Manhunters, the Metal Men, Red Tornado, Robotman, Hourman, and Metallo are but a few examples.  These 'beings' are most often created by individuals who possess vast intellects, like scientists Professor T.O. Morrow (maker of the Red Tornado), Dr. Will Magnus (who constructed the Metal Men) and Professor Ivo (who fabricated Amazo and other advanced androids using a form of Nano-technology developed by Lexcorp). Brainiac also emulates this technology as well as technology from other worlds. Similarly, some characters use technology to enhance their armor or modify cybernetic functions, for example Steel, Cyborg and the Cyborg Superman.

Hidden races
There are a few intelligent races living on Earth that the public at large did not know about until recent times. Among these are the Amazons of Themyscira and Bana-Mighdall and the last survivors of Atlantis, who changed themselves into water-breathing forms, including the human-like Poseidonians and the mermaid-like Tritonians.  Other species, such as Warworlders, were brief test subjects of Project Cadmus who fled to the Underworld below Metropolis.  There is also a tribe of highly intelligent, telepathic gorillas living in Gorilla City, an invisible city hidden in Africa; this is the home of Gorilla Grodd.

Certain creatures created such as angelic beings, timeline driven entities, experimental deformities and dimension creatures are not considered hidden races because it is simply not included.  However, it is only because most monsters play a less substantial role in the DC Universe.  The plot-lines of Dinosaur Island and Skartaris are but a few examples of the experiments the DC universe contrives, yet its role in DC comics are played down when in comparison to other companies, therefore they are included as being a race from Earth.  An easternized influence is more evident in most Marvel Comics literature, while DC Comics are exaggerated, under-influenced or sustained into the belief of comical parodies; e.g. the story-line of the alien, Monstergirl, and her affluent life-style as a teenage recluse who turns into a monster or the purpose of Asmodel, an angelic inter-dimensional being from a conceptual Heaven who comes to Earth.  Therefore, these particular races are not considered hidden but alien and extra-dimensional (see the following sections below for reference).

Aliens

There are many intelligent extraterrestrial races as well. Curiously, a large number of them are humanoid, even human-like, in form (such as Kryptonians, who outwardly appear identical to Earth-born humans); some can even interbreed with Terrans. Some of these races have natural superpowers, but they are usually the same for all individuals of the same race, unlike Earth's metahumans. This was explained by the fact that in Earth's distant past Martians experimented on humanity, severely culling the metahuman potential; this means that a species that was meant to have a wide range of powers, like Tamaranians or Kryptonians, ended up "just...human". However, there are also plenty of nonhumanoid races.

The DC Universe has had many natural and cosmic disasters happen to their alien civilizations.  The Martians were destroyed by war, the Kryptonians by a dying planet that exploded, and the Czarnians by a plague. Even the Almeracian Empire was victim to impending destruction by Imperiex.

Order is kept around the galaxy by the Guardians of the Universe and their agents, the Green Lantern Corps. Rival peacekeeping organizations include the Darkstars (created by the Guardians' rivals, the Controllers) and the interplanetary mercenary organization L.E.G.I.O.N.  Criminal organizations include the Manhunters, the Spider Guild and the Dark Circle.

Most aliens are from different planets, who have a source of origin near the Solar System and in the Milky Way Galaxy, although, unlike the Marvel Universe, alien colonies are common within the solar system. The Dominators are an imperialistic race of terrorist aliens who control most of the unknown cosmos in order to extract genetic resources from planets.  The caste is also collectively known as the Dominion. Other aliens in the outlying galaxies control armadas like the Khunds, Gordanians, Thanagarians, Spider Guild and, most recently, the Reach. Even though the majority of the DC Universe is policed by the Green Lantern Corps, and later the United Planets, most rogue races strive to conquer the known universe.

One oddity is the Vegan star system. Due to an arrangement with the Psions, the Guardians did not intervene in that system, allowing a cruel empire called "the Citadel" to govern there, until it was overthrown by the Omega Men.

Cosmic entities
The Presence is the God of the DC Universe; he created all reality. He is also among the most powerful beings in Creation.

There are several lesser beings in the DC universe that possess god-like powers, through energy manipulation, magic ability, or technological advancement. Magic and the supernatural are often depicted as being real in the DC Universe, though some skeptics, such as Mister Terrific, maintain that there are scientific explanations to all such events. The narration of the mystic and harsh dark reality is more common in DC's Vertigo Comics because its stories lurk outside of superhero fantasy; the Vertigo series have beings that relate better to civilian life, although both universes are subject to fantastical realms and unworldly dimensions.  Magic is too powerful in the physical world, where harnessing magic can distort and even destroy reality if not properly controlled (e.g., if a Lord of Order succumbs to certain events, so will a Lord of Chaos).

There are several types of cosmic entities, such as:
 Gods: The first beings calling themselves 'gods' first appeared billions of years ago on another planet, but they destroyed themselves in a terrible war. This unleashed the "Godwave", a wave of cosmic energy from the Source. This gave birth to other gods across the universe, including Earth's. From the planet's remains the worlds of Apokolips and New Genesis were formed, inhabited by beings that call themselves the "New Gods". The Source Wall is an archetype of Buddha on the edge of the known galaxy. Certain speedsters believe in enlightenment in order to become part of the Speed Force (see below). Kismet is an immortal god and the embodiment of reality. She was matched with Marvel's Eternity in  JLA/Avengers. In mortal form she was a member of the Lords of Order.  Depending on the characters, other diverse religious deities from ancient cultures are common. Heroes such as Aztek and Black Condor, or villains like Black Adam, have found knowledge of their native roots in origin.
 Death represents different characters in the DC Universe. One personification of death is the Black Flash, who can represent Death as an internal figure for the speedsters in the DC Universe.  Another is Death (see below), who resides at the very end of time. The Black Racer appears as Death in the afterlife. There also is Nekron, lord of the Land of the Unliving, who is the embodiment of Death as the ultimate opponent. Death is also one of the Endless, and is the ultimate personification of Death in the DCU.
 The Lords of Chaos and Order: These two groups of magical beings have been fighting against each other since the beginning of time and they often empower others (with "Order Magic" or "Chaos Magic") in exchange for their acting as their agents. Many magical heroes and villains have been manipulated by them. The Lords of Chaos and Order were killed by the Spectre in Day Of Vengeance: Infinite Crisis Special #1.
 Elementals: The Earth itself has a living spirit called "Maya" who, for millennia, has been creating champions, one for each of the mystical elements, to protect itself, using human beings as their hosts. The Swamp Thing, Firestorm, Naiad and the Red Tornado were some of them.
 Homo magi: a species of humanity with the natural ability to use magic, this race almost disappeared after too much crossbreeding with normal humans (it is from them that people in the DC Universe inherited the ability to use magic). The last pure-blooded ones decided to retire to a magical invisible city centuries ago and are now known as "the Hidden Ones". Zatanna knows many of the race's secrets, and Traci Thirteen is currently investigating magical and occult phenomena for the Croatoan Society—both women had Homo magi mothers.
 The Endless: Physical manifestations of eternal and universal phenomena that affect the human condition (Destiny, Death, Dream, Destruction, Despair, Desire and Delirium), principally recounted in the Modern Age Sandman series.
 Emotional Manifestations: Like the Endless, these beings were created from the emotional energy generated by sentient beings. Each of the seven emotional manifestations of the DCU is represented by a different color (rage - red; greed - orange; fear - yellow; will - green; hope - blue; compassion - indigo; love - violet) and being.  The various power-ring based corps of the DCU, most notably the Green Lantern Corps and Sinestro Corps, utilize the energies of these beings.
 Wizards and Sorcerers:  Various sorcerers lurk in the DCU.  Dr. Fate, Circe, the wizard Shazam, Mordru and Felix Faust are written as characters who use sorcery to both create and destroy. Dimensions, rituals and spiritual realms are sources for magic power as seen in Ras al Ghul's Lazarus Pit, Doctor Occult's use of the astral plane and the transformations of Captain Marvel.
 Demons: Demonic entities vary from Etrigan the Demon to Blaze, Satanus and Neron.  Demonic entities are abundant and come from Hell although some, like Eclipso the vengeance demon (also referred to as the Prince of Darkness), reside on the Moon.  Demonic entities from Wonder Woman comics are directly linked to Greek mythology such as Hades and Ares. In the Vertigo comics, characters like John Constantine oppose demons influenced by Christian mythology.  Most demons are not, however, directly linked to demonology.
 The Monitors were incredibly powerful cosmic beings. Originally, a Monitor and an Anti-Monitor were byproducts of the event that created the Multiverse. As archenemies, they fought for billions of years, before enlisting the help of warriors and causing the Crisis, during which both were killed. After the Multiverse was reborn, the origins of the Monitors was revised. In the Post-Crisis continuity, the Monitors were a vast civilization tasked with protecting and guiding the various worlds of the Multiverse. They were also vampires and had to resist the urge to feed on the universes that they were born to protect.

Other dimensions
The DC Universe is composed of a number of different dimensional planes, most notably parallel Earths (see Multiverse), but the latter were eliminated when reality was altered by the Anti-Monitor (although stories featuring parallel Earths have continued to crop up with various rationalizations in the following years). Other types of dimensions still exist, however, including the Antimatter Universe of Qward, the Pax dimension, the Fifth Dimension and the Bleed. Prison dimensions, such as the Phantom Zone, are meant to house superpowered criminals who are too powerful for any conventional means of containment. Dimensions make up many universes, of which some are created and destroyed with help from supernatural forces and elements from which power is drawn. As well, certain dimensions function as crossover opportunities for heroes from different comic book companies to interact, either from competing companies, or from companies absorbed by competitors. The most notable example of the first kind of crossover has been between DC Comics and Marvel Comics, and the latter with Wildstorm Comics. An example of the latter kind of crossover would be DC's acquisition of Fawcett Comics, Quality Comics, and Charlton Comics and the absorption into the DC continuity of the original Captain Marvel, Plastic Man and Captain Atom. In this way, heroes originally published by different companies are now part of the same fictional universe, and interactions between such characters are no longer considered intercompany crossovers.

Additionally, the Marvel Comics Universe is also said to exist in the DC Universe as one of the many alternative universes. The reverse may also be said with respect to the Marvel Universe. This is one method of explaining the various crossover stories co-published by the two companies.

Heaven and Hell
Heaven and Hell exist in the DC Universe but may not exist in the same continuum.  Versions vary from the Vertigo and DC Universe series with writers of the Vertigo Universe depicting them in relation to religion and mythology while the writers in the DCU have a tendency to narrate fantasy.

Speed Force
The Speed Force is an extradimensional energy source which provides the speedsters of the DC Universe with their powers. Accessing the Speed Force makes it possible to run at incredible speeds, even faster than light, and even to jump in and out of the timestream, thereby travelling - albeit with a limited degree of control - through time. The Speed Force also acts as a kind of Valhalla for deceased speedsters.  The Flash: Rebirth reveals that Barry Allen is a living generator of the Speed Force ever since the accident that transformed him into the Flash.

The timestream
It is possible to travel in time in this universe by several means, including moving faster than the speed of light. The Legion of Super-Heroes from 1,000 years into the future in particular have access to time-travel technology (although the threeboot Legion lacks time travel technology) while Rip Hunter is the present day authority of the technology. Originally, it was impossible to change the past, or to exist in two places at the same time (a time traveler appearing in an era where they already existed would become an ineffectual, invisible phantom while there). However that was all changed after the Anti-Monitor tried to change history at the beginning of time during the Crisis on Infinite Earths. Also, a number of alternate realities-known as Hypertime-now exist. A group calling itself the Linear Men formed to prevent anyone from changing history. In addition, an enormously powerful being called the Time Trapper, an enemy of the Legion, has been known to manipulate the timestream, even creating "pocket universes".

DC Universe comics 
 DC Universe: Legacies
 DC Universe Online: Legends

In other media 
 DC Universe Roleplaying Game

Film 
 Films based on DC Comics:
 Superman in film
 Batman in film
DC films 
Flash in film
Wonder Woman in film
 DC Extended Universe
 DC Universe (franchise)
 The Lego Movie, The Lego Batman Movie and The Lego Movie 2: The Second Part (set in a multiverse of which a Lego DC Universe is part)

Television 
 List of television series based on DC Comics
 Arrow, The Flash, Legends of Tomorrow, Supergirl, Vixen, Black Lightning, Batwoman and Superman & Lois (set in the same multiverse, known as the Arrowverse). Stargirl
 DC Universe

Animation 
 DC animated universe
 DC Universe Animated Original Movies
 Teen Titans
 Teen Titans Go!
 Young Justice

Toys 
 DC Universe (toyline)
 DC Universe Classics

Video games 
 Video games based on DC Comics:
 List of Superman video games
 List of Batman video games
 Mortal Kombat vs. DC Universe
 DC Universe Online
 Lego Batman 2: DC Super Heroes
 Injustice: Gods Among Us
 Injustice 2
 Scribblenauts Unmasked: A DC Comics Adventure
 Infinite Crisis
Suicide Squad: Kill the Justice League
 The Lego Movie Videogame, The Lego Batman Movie Game, Lego Dimensions and The Lego Movie 2 Videogame (set in the same multiverse as the aforementioned films)

See also
 History of the DC Universe
 List of events of the DC Universe
 List of locations of the DC Universe
 List of fictional universes in animation and comics

References

External links
 The Unauthorized Chronology of the DC Universe
 The Continuity Pages: DC Universe Chronology
 Mike's Amazing World of Comics
 DC Database a DC universe Wiki

 
Canons (fiction)
Fictional universes
Mythopoeia
Science fantasy comics
Science fantasy franchises
Superhero comics
Superhero franchises